A boiler explosion is a catastrophic failure of a boiler. There are two types of boiler explosions.  One type is a failure of the pressure parts of the steam and water sides. There can be many different causes, such as failure of the safety valve, corrosion of critical parts of the boiler, or low water level. Corrosion along the edges of lap joints was a common cause of early boiler explosions.

The second kind is a fuel/air explosion in the furnace, which would more properly be termed a firebox explosion. Firebox explosions in solid-fuel-fired boilers are rare, but firebox explosions in gas or oil-fired boilers are still a potential hazard.

Causes 

There are many causes for boiler explosions such as poor water treatment causing scaling and over heating of the plates, low water level, a stuck safety valve, or even a furnace explosion that in turn, if severe enough, can cause a boiler explosion. Poor operator training resulting in neglect or other mishandling of the boiler has been a frequent cause of explosions since the beginning of the industrial revolution. In the late 19th and early 20th century, the inspection records of various sources in the U.S., UK, and Europe showed that the most frequent cause of boiler explosions was weakening of boilers through simple rusting, by anywhere from two to five times more than all other causes.

Before materials science, inspection standards, and quality control caught up with the rapidly growing boiler manufacturing industry, a significant number of boiler explosions were directly traceable to poor design, workmanship, and undetected flaws in poor quality materials. The alarming frequency of boiler failures in the U.S. due to defects in materials and design were attracting the attention of international engineering standards organizations, such as the ASME, which established their first Boiler Testing Code in 1884.  The boiler explosion that caused the Grover Shoe Factory disaster in Brockton, Massachusetts on March 10, 1905 resulted in 58 deaths and 117 injuries, and inspired the state of Massachusetts to publish its first boiler laws in 1908.

Several written sources provide a concise description of the causes of boiler explosions:

"The principal causes of explosions, in fact the only causes, are deficiency of strength in the shell or other parts of the boilers, over-pressure and over-heating. Deficiency of strength in steam boilers may be due to original defects, bad workmanship, deterioration from use or mismanagement."

And:

"Cause.-Boiler explosions are always due to the fact that some part of the boiler is, for some reason, too weak to withstand the pressure to which it is subjected. This may be due to one of two causes: Either the boiler is not strong enough to safely carry its proper working pressure, or else the pressure has been allowed to rise above the usual point by the sticking of the safety valves, or some similar cause"

Early investigations into causes 
While deterioration and mishandling are probably the most common causes of boiler explosions, the actual mechanism of a catastrophic boiler failure was not well documented until extensive experimentation was undertaken by U.S. boiler inspectors in the early 20th century. Several different attempts were made to cause a boiler to explode by various means, but one of the most interesting experiments demonstrated that in certain circumstances, if a sudden opening in the boiler allowed steam to escape too rapidly, water hammer could cause destruction of the entire pressure vessel:

"A cylindrical boiler was tested and withstood a steam pressure of 300 pounds (300 psi or 2,068 kPa) without injury." " When the [discharge] valve was suddenly opened at a pressure of 235 pounds [] the boiler gave way, the iron being twisted and torn into fragments and thrown in all directions. The reason for this was that the sudden rush of steam from the boiler into the discharge pipe reduced the pressure in the boiler very rapidly. This reduction of pressure caused the sudden formation of a great quantity of steam within the water, and the heavy mass of water being thrown with great violence toward the opening whence the steam was being withdrawn, struck the portions of the boiler near that opening and caused the fracture."

In locomotives 
Boiler explosions are of a particular danger in (locomotive-type) fire tube boilers because the top of the firebox (crown sheet) must be covered with some amount of water at all times; or the heat of the fire can weaken the crown sheet or crown stays to the point of failure, even at normal working pressure.

This was the cause of the Gettysburg Railroad firebox explosion near Gardners, Pennsylvania, in 1995, where low water allowed the front of the crown sheet to overheat until the regular crown stays pulled through the sheet, releasing a great deal of steam and water under full boiler pressure into the firebox. The crown sheet design included several alternating rows of button-head safety stays, which limited the failure of the crown sheet to the first five or six rows of conventional stays, preventing a collapse of the entire crown sheet.

This type of failure is not limited to railway engines, as locomotive-type boilers have been used for traction engines, portable engines, skid engines used for mining or logging, stationary engines for sawmills and factories, for heating, and as package boilers providing steam for other processes. In all applications, maintaining the proper water level is essential for safe operation.

Hewison (1983) gives a comprehensive account of British boiler explosions, listing 137 between 1815 and 1962.  It is noteworthy that 122 of these were in the 19th century and only 15 in the 20th century.

Boiler explosions generally fell into two categories.  The first is the breakage of the boiler barrel itself, through weakness/damage or excessive internal pressure, resulting in sudden discharge of steam over a wide area. Stress corrosion cracking at the lap joints was a common cause of early boiler explosions, probably caused by caustic embrittlement. The water used in boilers was not often closely controlled, and if acidic, could corrode the wrought iron boiler plates. Galvanic corrosion was an additional problem where copper and iron were in contact.
Boiler plates have been thrown up to a quarter of a mile (Hewison, Rolt). The second type is the collapse of the firebox under steam pressure from the adjoining boiler, releasing flames and hot gases into the cab. Improved design and maintenance almost totally eliminated the first type, but the second type is always possible if the engineer and fireman do not maintain the water level in the boiler.

Boiler barrels could explode if the internal pressure became too high.  To prevent this, safety valves were installed to release the pressure at a set level. Early examples were spring-loaded, but John Ramsbottom invented a tamper-proof valve which was universally adopted. The other common cause of explosions was internal corrosion which weakened the boiler barrel so that it could not withstand normal operating pressure. In particular, grooves could occur along horizontal seams (lap joints) below water level. Dozens of explosions resulted, but were eliminated by 1900 by the adoption of butt joints, plus improved maintenance schedules and regular hydraulic testing.

Fireboxes were generally made of copper, though later locomotives had steel fireboxes.  They were held to the outer part of the boiler by stays (numerous small supports).  Parts of the firebox in contact with full steam pressure have to be kept covered with water, to stop them overheating and weakening.  The usual cause of firebox collapses is that the boiler water level falls too low and the top of the firebox (crown sheet) becomes uncovered and overheats.  This occurs if the fireman has failed to maintain water level or the level indicator (gauge glass) is faulty.  A less common reason is breakage of large numbers of stays, due to corrosion or unsuitable material.

Throughout the 20th century, two boiler barrel failures and thirteen firebox collapses occurred in the UK. The boiler barrel failures occurred at Cardiff in 1909 and Buxton in 1921; both were caused by misassembly of the safety valves causing the boilers to exceed their design pressures. Of the 13 firebox collapses, four were due to broken stays, one to scale buildup on the firebox, and the rest were due to low water level.

Principle 
Many shell-type boilers carry a large bath of liquid water which is heated to a higher temperature and pressure (enthalpy) than boiling water would be at atmospheric pressure. During normal operation, the liquid water remains in the bottom of the boiler due to gravity, steam bubbles rise through the liquid water and collect at the top for use until saturation pressure is reached, then the boiling stops. If some pressure is released, boiling begins again, and so on.

If steam is released normally, say by opening a throttle valve, the bubbling action of the water remains moderate and relatively dry steam can be drawn from the highest point in the vessel.

If steam is released more quickly, the more vigorous boiling action that results can throw a fine spray of droplets up as "wet steam" which can cause damage to piping, engines, turbines and other equipment downstream.

If a large crack or other opening in the boiler vessel allows the internal pressure to drop very suddenly, the heat energy remaining in the water will cause even more of the liquid to flash into steam bubbles, which then rapidly displace the remaining liquid. The potential energy of the escaping steam and water are now transformed into work, just as they would have done in an engine; with enough force to peel back the material around the break, severely distorting the shape of the plate which was formerly held in place by stays, or self-supported by its original cylindrical shape. The rapid release of steam and water can provide a very potent blast, and cause great damage to surrounding property or personnel.

The rapidly expanding steam bubbles can also perform work by throwing large "slugs" of water inside the boiler in the direction of the opening, and at astonishing velocities. A fast-moving mass of water carries a great deal of kinetic energy (from the expanding steam), and in collision with the shell of the boiler results in a violent destructive effect. This can greatly enlarge the original rupture, or tear the shell in two.

Many plumbers, firefighters, and  steamfitters are aware of this phenomenon, which is called  "water hammer". A several-ounce "slug" of water passing through a steam line at high velocity and striking a 90-degree elbow can instantly fracture a fitting that is otherwise capable of handling several times the normal static pressure. It can then be understood that a few hundred, or even a few thousand pounds of water moving at the same velocity inside a boiler shell can easily blow out a tube sheet, collapse a firebox, even toss the entire boiler a surprising distance through reaction as the water exits the boiler, like the recoil of a heavy cannon firing a ball.

Several accounts of the SL-1 experimental reactor accident vividly describe the incredibly powerful effect of water hammer on a pressure vessel: "The expansion caused by this heating process caused water hammer as water was accelerated upwards toward the reactor vessel head, producing approximately 10,000 pounds per square inch (69,000 kPa) of pressure on the head of the reactor vessel when water struck the head at 160 feet per second (50 m/s) ...This extreme form of water hammer propelled control rods, shield plugs, and the entire reactor vessel upward. A later investigation concluded that the 26,000-pound (12,000 kg) vessel had jumped 9 feet 1 inch (2.77 m) and the upper control rod drive mechanisms had struck the ceiling of the reactor building prior to settling back into its original location"

Since standard pressure saturated water has a specific enthalpy of just , the difference between the two specific enthalpies, is the total energy expended in the explosion.

Firebox explosions 
In the case of a firebox explosion, these typically occur after a burner flameout. Oil fumes, natural gas, propane, coal, or any other fuel can build up inside the combustion chamber. This is especially of concern when the vessel is hot; the fuels will rapidly volatilize due to the temperature. Once the lower explosive limit (LEL) is reached, any source of ignition will cause an explosion of the vapors.

A fuel explosion within the confines of the firebox may damage the pressurized boiler tubes and interior shell, potentially triggering structural failure, steam or water leakage, and/or a secondary boiler shell failure and steam explosion.

A common form of minor firebox "explosion" is known as "drumming" and can occur with any type of fuel. Instead of the normal "roar" of the fire, a rhythmic series of "thumps" and flashes of fire below the grate and through the firedoor indicate that the combustion of the fuel is proceeding through a rapid series of detonations, caused by an inappropriate air/fuel mixture with regard to the level of draft available. This usually causes no damage in locomotive type boilers, but can cause cracks in masonry boiler settings if allowed to continue.

Grooving 
The plates of early locomotive boilers were joined by simple overlapping joints. This practice was satisfactory for the annular joints, running around the boiler, but in longitudinal joints, along the length of the boiler, the overlap of the plates diverted the boiler cross-section from its ideal circular shape. Under pressure the boiler strained to reach, as nearly as possible, the circular cross-section. Because the double-thickness overlap was stronger than the surrounding metal, the repeated bending and release caused by the variations in boiler pressure caused internal cracks, or grooves (deep pitting), along the length of the joint. The cracks offered a starting point for internal corrosion, which could hasten failure. It was eventually found that this internal corrosion could be reduced by using plates of sufficient size so that no joints were situated below the water level. Eventually the simple lap seam was replaced by the single or double butt-strap seams, which do not suffer from this defect.

Due to the constant expansion and contraction of the firebox a similar form of "stress corrosion" can take place at the ends of staybolts where they enter the firebox plates, and is accelerated by poor water quality.  Often referred to as "necking", this type of corrosion can reduce the strength of the staybolts until they are incapable of supporting the firebox at normal pressure.

Grooving (deep, localized pitting) also occurs near the waterline, particularly in boilers that are fed with water that has not been de-aerated or treated with oxygen scavenging agents. All "natural" sources of water contain dissolved air, which is released as a gas when the water is heated. The air (which contains oxygen) collects in a layer near the surface of the water and greatly accelerates corrosion of the boiler plates in that area.

Firebox 
The intricate shape of a locomotive firebox, whether made of soft copper or of steel, can only resist the  steam pressure on its internal walls  if these are supported by stays attached to internal girders and the outer walls. They are liable to fail through fatigue (because the inner and outer walls expand at different rates under the heat of the fire), from corrosion, or from wasting as  the heads of the  stays exposed to the fire are burned away. If the stays fail the firebox will explode inwards. Regular visual inspection, internally and externally, is employed to prevent this. Even a well-maintained firebox will fail explosively if the water level in the boiler is allowed to fall far enough to leave the top plate of the firebox uncovered. This can occur when crossing the summit of the hill, as the water flows to the front part of the boiler and can expose the firebox crown sheet. The majority of locomotive explosions are firebox explosions caused by such crown sheet uncovering.

Steamboat boilers 

The Pennsylvania was a side wheeler steamboat which suffered a boiler explosion in the Mississippi River and sank at Ship Island near Memphis, Tennessee, on June 13, 1858. Of the 450 passengers on board more than 250 died, including Henry Clemens, the younger brother of the author Mark Twain.

SS Ada Hancock, a small steamboat used to transfer passengers and cargo to and from the large coastal steamships that stopped in San Pedro Harbor in the early 1860s, suffered disaster when its boiler exploded violently in San Pedro Bay, the port of Los Angeles, near Wilmington, California on April 27, 1863 killing twenty-six people and injuring many others of the fifty-three or more passengers on board.

The steamboat Sultana was destroyed in an explosion on 27 April 1865, resulting in the greatest maritime disaster in United States history.  An estimated 1,549 passengers were killed when three of the ship's four boilers exploded and the Sultana burned and sank not far from Memphis, Tennessee. The cause was traced to a poorly executed repair to the shell of one boiler; the patch failed, and debris from that boiler ruptured two more.

Another US Civil War Steamboat explosion was the Steamer Eclipse on January 27, 1865, which was carrying members of the 9th Indiana Artillery. One official Records report mentions the disaster reports 10 killed and 68 injured; a later report mentions that 27 were killed and 78 wounded. Fox's Regimental Losses reports 29 killed.

Whether, in 1879, the boiler of Canada's Waubuno exploded or not, and, if it exploded, whether it was due to negligent upkeep or to contact with the cold water of Georgian Bay while foundering in a storm, is contested.

Use of boilers 
The stationary steam engines used to power machinery first came to prominence during the industrial revolution, and in the early days there were many boiler explosions from a variety of causes. One of the first investigators of the problem was William Fairbairn, who helped establish the first insurance company dealing with the losses such explosions could cause. He also established experimentally that the hoop stress in a cylindrical pressure vessel like a boiler was twice the longitudinal stress. Such investigations helped him and others explain the importance of stress concentrations in weakening boilers.

Modern boilers 
Modern boilers are designed with redundant pumps, valves, water level monitors, fuel cutoffs, automated controls, and pressure relief valves. In addition, the construction must adhere to strict engineering guidelines set by the relevant authorities. The NBIC, ASME, and others attempt to ensure safe boiler designs by publishing detailed standards. The result is a boiler unit which is less prone to catastrophic accidents.

Also improving safety is the increasing use of "package boilers." These are boilers which are built at a factory then shipped out as a complete unit to the job site.  These typically have better quality and fewer issues than boilers which are site assembled tube-by-tube. A package boiler only needs the final connections to be made (electrical, breaching, condensate lines, etc.) to complete the installation.

Steam explosions 
In steam locomotive boilers, as knowledge was gained by trial and error in early days, the explosive situations and consequent damage due to explosions were inevitable. However, improved design and maintenance markedly reduced the number of boiler explosions by the end of the 19th century.  Further improvements continued in the 20th century.

On land-based boilers, explosions of the pressure systems happened regularly in stationary steam boilers in the Victorian era, but are now very rare because of the various protections provided, and because of regular inspections compelled by governmental and industry requirements.

Water heaters can explode with surprising violence when their safety devices fail.

Reactor explosions 
A steam explosion can occur in any kind of a water heater, where a sufficient amount of energy is delivered and the steam created exceeds the strength of the vessel. When the heat delivery is sufficiently rapid, a localized superheating can occur, resulting in a water hammer destroying the vessel. The SL-1 nuclear reactor accident is an example of a superheated burst of steam.  However, in the SL1 example the pressure was released by the forced ejection of control rods which allowed the steam to be vented.  The reactor did not explode, nor did the vessel rupture.

See also 
 Steam explosion
 Boiling liquid expanding vapor explosion (BLEVE)
 Boiler safety
 Fusible plug
 Grover Shoe Factory disaster
 List of boiler explosions
 Lists of rail accidents
 William Fairbairn
 John Hick

Notes

Bibliography

References

Further reading 
 Bartrip, P.W.J. The state and the steam boiler in Britain International review of social history 25, 1980, 77-105. Government intervention and the role of interest groups in 19th Century Britain in regard to stationary boilers.
 Winship, I.R. The decline in locomotive boiler explosions in Britain 1850 – 1900 Transactions  –  Newcomen Society 60, 1988 – 89, 73 – 94. Technical and other factors that reduced the incidence of explosions.

External links 

 
Boilers
Explosion protection
Steam power